This is a list of Ice Road Truckers Season 10 episodes.
Per the History Channel website, Season 10 (which the site calls Season X or "IRT X") premiered on August 4, 2016 at 10/9c.

Episodes

Darrell Ward was killed in a small plane crash on August 28, 2016. All of this season's episode broadcasts in Canada, and all those in the United States from #5 on (as are rebroadcasts of the first four) are dedicated to his memory.

Returning drivers
Debogorski, Darrell Ward, Kelly, Dewey  and Burke continue driving for their respective companies. Mark Kohaykewych briefly drives Darrell's truck, as well as a heavy loader to push trucks over steep hills during the two-part season finale convoy.

This was Darrell Ward's final season, as he was killed in a plane crash on August 28, 2016.

New driver
 Stephanie "Steph" Custance: Steph, 22, is a first-year ice road trucker with less than one year of commercial driving experience. Mark hires her to work for Polar, deciding that his need for drivers outweighs the problems he sees during her road test. She has a five-year-old son.

Route and destinations
Manitoba/Ontario/Alberta ice roads: In addition to previously seen destinations in Manitoba and Ontario, two new destinations were added in Season 10: Fort Chipewyan, Alberta and Summer Beaver, Ontario.

References 

2016 American television seasons
Ice Road Truckers seasons